St George City is an Australian football club based in St George, New South Wales. They currently compete in the National Premier Leagues in New South Wales. St George City is the representative side of the St George Football Association (SGFA).

Senior Team History 
Founded in late 2015, St George City was created with the aim of providing a new way for players aged 13 to 16 to progress into senior football from their SAP program. The club's ultimate goal was to obtain a Football NSW National Premier League (NPL) Youth License, which required the presence of a senior team in the National Premier Leagues system. This would enable the youth team to participate in the NPL youth system. At the start of 2016, St George City was set to play in NSW State League under former NSL player, Manny Spanoudakis. The same year, they finished the league as Premiers and Championship winners, defeating Hurstville ZFC in the grand final on penalties. This earned them promotion, on their debut season, to NPL NSW 3.

In their first season in NPL NSW 3, St George City finished third in the division behind Fraser Park FC and Rydalmere Lions FC before ending their season, being knocked out, by the eventual winners Fraser Park in the semi final. The 2018 season saw St George City winning the premiership, and earning promotion with 5 points ahead of runners-up, Hawkesbury City FC. This lead them to a earning the double beating SD Raiders 2-0 to win the championship.

St George City entered 2019 under new manager, Mirko Jurilj following the departure of Spanoudakis who went to join Marconi. They also signed former A-League Men player Corey Gameiro and Nick Sullivan to their squad who both departed by the end of the season. During the 2019 season, St George City played their first derby match at home against St George FC, with the score ending in a 1-1 draw. At the conclusion of the season, St George finished 11th and for the first time in the club history not qualify to a finals series.

It wasn't until 2022, when St George City finally earned promotion to NPL NSW Men's division after coming runners-up and beating premiership winners, Central Coast Mariners Academy, 2-1, in extra time after a late goal from Damian German to win them the championship.

Club colours 
The club colours are red and white. The club's home kit is a red shirt, with white pants and red socks with their kit sponsor being Stanno.

Stadium 
After its establishment in 2016, St George City primarily played in Peter Moore Field in Bankstown during the 2016 season in NSW State league. The club then shared a field with Fraser Park FC before moving to and playing in Jubilee Stadium for two years.

St George City moved to the newly re-developed Penshurst Park which is based in Penshurst in the St George area. The redevelopment reportedly cost up to $17 million and adds new facilities to the sporting complex including an increase of 265 seating capacity. Futher development is being planned prior to 2022, adding new synthetic fields and improved facilities to the complex.

Current squad
''As of December 2022"

Honours
NPL 2/NSW League One Champions 2022
NPL 3/NSW League Two Premiers 2018
NPL 3/NSW League Two Champions 2018
NSW State League Premiers 2016
NSW State League Champions 2018

References

External links
 St George City Official Teams Web Page
 Football St George FA Official  Web Site

Soccer clubs in Sydney
National Premier Leagues clubs